Route 321 is a , two-lane, uncontrolled-access, local highway in eastern Prince Edward Island. Its southern terminus is at Route 3 in Lot 53 and its northern terminus is at Route 2 in Morell. The route is entirely in Kings County.

Route description

The route begins at its southern terminus and heads north, crossing the Cardigan River. It joins Route 4 for a  concurrency before continuing north. It then curves east and then curves back north before ending at its northern terminus.

References

321
321
Prince Edward Island provincial highways